The 2021–22 Nemzeti Bajnokság I (also known as 2021–22 OTP Bank Liga), also known as NB I, was the 123rd season of top-tier football in Hungary. The league was officially named OTP Bank Liga for sponsorship reasons. Ferencváros were the defending champions.

Teams
Diósgyőr and Budafok finished the 2020–21 Nemzeti Bajnokság I in the last two places and thus were relegated to NB II division.

The two relegated teams were replaced with the top two teams in 2020–21 Nemzeti Bajnokság II, champion Debrecen and runner-up Gyirmót, each having the required licence for top-division play.

Stadium and locations
Following is the list of clubs competing in the league this season, with their location, stadium and stadium capacity.

Personnel and kits
All teams are obligated to have the logo of the league sponsor OTP Bank as well as the Nemzeti Bajnokság I logo on the right side of their shirt. Hungarian national sports betting brand Tippmix sponsors all 12 teams of the first league since February 2019, their logo is therefore present on all team kits.

Note: Flags indicate national team as has been defined under FIFA eligibility rules. Players and Managers may hold more than one non-FIFA nationality.

League table

Standings

Fixtures and results

Rounds 1–22

Rounds 23–33

Statistics

Top goalscorers

Hat-tricks

See also
2021–22 Magyar Kupa
2021–22 Nemzeti Bajnokság II
2021–22 Nemzeti Bajnokság III
2021–22 Megyei Bajnokság I

References

External links
  
 Official rules 
 uefa.com

Nemzeti Bajnokság I seasons
1
Hungary